Millwood is a census-designated place and coal town located in Westmoreland County, Pennsylvania, United States.  Their post office closed in 1927. It was also known as Akers.  As of the 2010 census the population was 566 residents.

Demographics

References

Census-designated places in Westmoreland County, Pennsylvania
Coal towns in Pennsylvania
Census-designated places in Pennsylvania